"La terra dei cachi" is a 1996 single by Elio e le Storie Tese.

Thanks to a live performance of this song, which represents a humorous take on Italian lifestyle, Elio e le Storie Tese acquired national notoriety by achieving a second-place finish at the Sanremo Music Festival 1996. "La terra dei cachi" also won the Critics' Award "Mia Martini" at the same festival.

A total of four versions of the single have been released: "La terra dei cachi live in Sanremo", "La terra dei cachi – Prezioso remix", "La terra dei cachi (The Rimini Tapes)", rearranged in a liscio version and featuring the Casadei Orchestra, and "La terra dei cachi", a promo single studio version of the song.

A studio version of the song has been released in Del meglio del nostro meglio Vol. 1, whereas the live version from Sanremo Music Festival has been included also in Eat the Phikis.

Track listing
La terra dei cachi live in Sanremo
"La terra dei cachi" (live in Sanremo)

La terra dei cachi – Prezioso remix
"La terra dei cachi (Prezioso Remix)"
"La terra dei cachi (The Rimini Tapes)" (feat. Raoul Casadei)

La terra dei cachi (The Rimini Tapes)
"La terra dei cachi" (feat. Raoul Casadei)
"Gli occhiali dell'amore"
"Mambo Italiano" (by Raoul Casadei and Italian Orchestra)

La terra dei cachi
"La terra dei cachi"

References

External links

Italian-language songs
1996 singles
1996 songs
Sanremo Music Festival songs